is a passenger railway station in located in the city of Kōka,  Shiga Prefecture, Japan, operated by the private railway operator Ohmi Railway.

Lines
Minakuchi Matsuo Station is served by the Ohmi Railway Main Line, and is located 42.7 rail kilometers from the terminus of the line at Maibara Station.

Station layout
The station consists of one side platform serving a single bi-directional track. There is no station building, but only a shelter on the platform. The station is unattended.

Platforms

Adjacent stations

History
Minakuchi Matsuo Station was opened on April 5, 1989.

Passenger statistics
In fiscal 2018, the station was used by an average of 63 passengers daily.

Surroundings
 Japan National Route 1
 Japan National Route 307

See also
List of railway stations in Japan

References

External links

 Ohmi Railway official site 

Railway stations in Shiga Prefecture
Railway stations in Japan opened in 1989
Kōka, Shiga